Donald Ray Chaney (born March 22, 1946) is an American former professional basketball player and coach,  most notable for winning two championships as a player on the Boston Celtics, and winning NBA Coach of The Year while leading the Houston Rockets.

Playing career

Chaney played basketball in college for the University of Houston, where he was a teammate of future Basketball Hall-of-Famer Elvin Hayes. Chaney played all 40 minutes of the famed "Game of the Century" at the Astrodome.  In that year's 1968 NBA draft, Chaney became the first-round pick (12th overall) of the Boston Celtics; he was also drafted by the Houston Mavericks of the American Basketball Association.

Chaney became a champion with the Boston Celtics during his rookie year, in 1969. On February 28, 1973, Chaney set a career high in points score with 32, in a win over the Golden State Warriors. He would also help the Celtics toward winning the 1974 NBA Finals. He also had a short two season stint with the Los Angeles Lakers from 1976–1977, and played in the ABA for one year with the Spirits of St. Louis from 1975–1976. Chaney was widely known for his defensive skills, appearing on NBA all-defensive teams five times during his career. He was also known for providing notable numbers in minutes off the bench.

Chaney is the only Boston Celtic who played with both Bill Russell (1956–1969) and Larry Bird (1979–1992).

Coaching career
After ending his playing career, Chaney spent 22 seasons in coaching of which he spent 12 seasons in the NBA. His tenure with the Los Angeles Clippers ended on April 22, 1987, after an NBA-worst 12–70 record in an injury-riddled 1986–87. He was succeeded by Gene Shue.

Awards
 1969 NBA Finals and 1974 NBA Finals champion
 NBA All-Defensive second team (1972, 1973, 1974, 1975 and 1977)
 NBA Coach of the Year Award with the Houston Rockets for the 1990–91 season, after leading the Houston Rockets to a 50–32 record.
 Louisiana Sports Hall of Fame (1991)
 Gold medal-winning US national team at the 1994 FIBA World Championship in Toronto, assistant coach

Head coaching record

|-
| style="text-align:left;"|L.A. Clippers
| style="text-align:left;"|
|21||9||12|||| align="center"|5th in Pacific|||—||—||—||—
| style="text-align:center;"|Missed playoffs
|-
| style="text-align:left;"|L.A. Clippers
| style="text-align:left;"|
|82||32||50|||| align="center"|4th in Pacific|||—||—||—||—
| style="text-align:center;"|Missed playoffs
|-
| style="text-align:left;"|L.A. Clippers
| style="text-align:left;"|
|82||12||70|||| align="center"|6th in Pacific|||—||—||—||—
| style="text-align:center;"|Missed playoffs
|-
| style="text-align:left;"|Houston
| style="text-align:left;"|
|82||45||37|||| align="center"|2nd in Midwest|||4||1||3||
| style="text-align:center;"|Lost in First Round
|-
| style="text-align:left;"|Houston
| style="text-align:left;"|
|82||41||41|||| align="center"|5th in Midwest|||4||1||3||
| style="text-align:center;"|Lost in First Round
|-
| style="text-align:left;"|Houston
| style="text-align:left;"|
|82||52||30|||| align="center"|3rd in Midwest|||3||0||3||
| style="text-align:center;"|Lost in First Round
|-
| style="text-align:left;"|Houston
| style="text-align:left;"|
|52||26||26|||| align="center"|(fired)|||—||—||—||—
| style="text-align:center;"|—
|-
| style="text-align:left;"|Detroit
| style="text-align:left;"|
|82||20||62|||| align="center"|7th in Central|||—||—||—||—
| style="text-align:center;"|Missed playoffs
|-
| style="text-align:left;"|Detroit
| style="text-align:left;"|
|82||28||54|||| align="center"|7th in Central|||—||—||—||—
| style="text-align:center;"|Missed playoffs
|-
| style="text-align:left;"|New York
| style="text-align:left;"|
|63||20||43|||| align="center"|7th in Atlantic|||—||—||—||—
| style="text-align:center;"|Missed playoffs
|-
| style="text-align:left;"|New York
| style="text-align:left;"|
|82||37||45|||| align="center"|6th in Atlantic|||—||—||—||—
| style="text-align:center;"|Missed playoffs
|-
| style="text-align:left;"|New York
| style="text-align:left;"|
|39||15||24|||| align="center"|(fired)|||—||—||—||—
| style="text-align:center;"|—
|- class="sortbottom"
| style="text-align:left;"|Career
| ||831||337||494|||| ||11||2||9||||

Personal life
Chaney during his coaching days was known for partaking in new "daredevil"-esque stunts just to see what they were like, including skydiving and racecar driving.

References

External links
 NBA coach bio

1946 births
Living people
20th-century African-American sportspeople
21st-century African-American people
African-American basketball coaches
African-American basketball players
American men's basketball coaches
American men's basketball players
Basketball coaches from Louisiana
Basketball players from Baton Rouge, Louisiana
Boston Celtics draft picks
Boston Celtics players
Detroit Pistons head coaches
Houston Cougars men's basketball players
Houston Mavericks draft picks
Houston Rockets head coaches
Los Angeles Clippers head coaches
Los Angeles Lakers players
McKinley Senior High School alumni
New York Knicks head coaches
Parade High School All-Americans (boys' basketball)
Shooting guards
Spirits of St. Louis players
Sportspeople from Baton Rouge, Louisiana